Captain of His Soul is a 1918 film directed by Gilbert P. Hamilton for Triangle Film Corporation. The scenario was adapted by Lillian Ducey from an Eleanor Talbot Kinkead magazine story, "Shackles."

Plot 
An aging man turns his pistol factory over to a new owner at the urging of his sons. Soon, however, he notices the new owner's corruption; the shock of this revelation triggers a heart attack, and the old man dies. Soon afterward, his sons suspect one another of murder.

Cast 

 William Desmond as Horace
 Claire McDowall as Annette
 Charles Gunn as Henry
 Jack Richardson as Martin

References 

1918 films
American drama films
1918 drama films
Films directed by Gilbert P. Hamilton
1910s American films